Advance Publications, Inc. is a privately-held American media company owned by Donald Newhouse and Samuel Irving Newhouse Jr., the sons of company founder Samuel Irving Newhouse Sr. It owns a large number of subsidiary companies, including American City Business Journals and Condé Nast and is a major shareholder in Charter Communications, Reddit and Warner Bros. Discovery.

History
The company is named after the Staten Island Advance, the first newspaper owned by the Newhouse family, in which Sam Newhouse bought a controlling interest in 1922.

On August 25, 2018, Advance/Newhouse ("A/N") notified Charter Communications that it intended to establish a credit facility collateralized by a portion of Advance/Newhouse Common Units in Charter Communications Holdings, LLC. That same month, Condé Nast CEO Robert A. Sauerberg Jr. announced his five-year strategy to generate $600 million in new revenue from new revenue streams while driving costs out of the business.

In March 2020, the company acquired The Ironman Group, a mass participation sports platform including the Ironman Triathlons and Absa Cape Epic mountain bike race, from the Wanda Sports Group.

Description
For most of its history, Advance did not have an official headquarters; most publications listed the Advance offices in Staten Island's Grasmere neighborhood as its nominal headquarters. 

, it was ranked as the 221st largest privately held company in the United States, according to Forbes.

Subsidiaries

, the group owns Condé Nast (which includes the magazines Vogue, The New Yorker and Wired), 1010data, Turnitin, The Ironman Group, Advance Local, ACBJ, Stage Entertainment, Leaders Group and Seattle-based digital agency Pop, Inc., and is a major shareholder in Reddit.

The company holds an 8.16% ownership in media conglomerate Warner Bros. Discovery, carried over from its 31% stake in predecessor Discovery, Inc. Advance also owns a 13% stake (as of 2016) in Charter Communications, which it received when Bright House Networks merged with Charter.

References

Further reading

External links
 

1922 establishments in New York City
 
Business newspapers published in the United States
Companies based in Staten Island
Magazine publishing companies of the United States
Newspaper companies of the United States
Publishing companies based in New York City
Privately held companies based in New York City
Publishing companies established in 1922
Warner Bros. Discovery
American companies established in 1922
Holding companies of the United States
Family-owned companies of the United States